Livuan/Reimber Rural LLG is a local-level government (LLG) of East New Britain Province, Papua New Guinea.

Wards
01. Rababat
02. Vunairoto
03. Kabakada
04. Nabata
05. Toboina
06. Raluan No.3
07. Putanagororoi
08. Vunalir
09. Ratongor
10. Vunadavai
11. Lungalunga
12. Mei-Livuan
13. Volavolo
14. Kuraip
15. Vunalaka
16. Vunakalkalulu
17. Taranga
18. Raburbur
19. Rakotop
20. Ramalmal
21. Vunailaiting
22. Vunakainalama
23. Towaleka
24. Ramale
25. Kikitabu
26. Vunaulaiting
27. Totovel
28. Rakada
29. Vunapaka

References

Local-level governments of East New Britain Province